Cape Breton was a provincial electoral district in Nova Scotia, Canada, that existed from 1867 to 1925. For the bulk of its existence, the district elected two members to the Nova Scotia House of Assembly. In 1925, Cape Breton and neighbouring Richmond County were divided into three electoral districts: Cape Breton East, Cape Breton Centre, and Richmond—West Cape Breton.

Members of the Legislative Assembly 
Cape Breton elected the following members to the Legislative Assembly. Except for a brief period from 1916-1925 when it elected four members, the Cape Breton district always elected two members to the Nova Scotia House of Assembly.

Election results

References

Former provincial electoral districts of Nova Scotia